Ryan Ridder (born November 11, 1984) is an American college basketball coach and current head coach for the UT Martin Skyhawks men's basketball team. He previously served as the head coach at Bethune-Cookman.

Coaching career
After completing a playing career at Embry-Riddle under his father, Steve, Ridder got his coaching start at North Raleigh Christian Academy as an assistant coach before returning to his alma mater as an assistant a year later. Ridder served as an assistant at Campbell for three seasons before taking the head coaching job at Daytona State College. While guiding the Falcons, Ridder compiled a 95-28 overall record, and four-straight Mid-Florida Conference regular season championships, as well as back-to-back coach of the year honors.

Ridder was named the head coach at Bethune-Cookman on March 31, 2017. After three seasons with the Wildcats, Ridder accepted the head coaching position at UT Martin on March 30, 2021.

Head coaching record

Junior college

College

References

1984 births
Living people
American men's basketball coaches
American men's basketball players
Basketball coaches from Kentucky
Basketball players from Lexington, Kentucky
UT Martin Skyhawks men's basketball coaches
Bethune–Cookman Wildcats men's basketball coaches
Campbell Fighting Camels basketball coaches
College men's basketball head coaches in the United States
Embry–Riddle Aeronautical University alumni
Sportspeople from Lexington, Kentucky
Wooster Fighting Scots men's basketball players